Larry Lauchle (born September 17, 1939) is an American wrestler. He competed in the men's Greco-Roman bantamweight at the 1960 Summer Olympics.

References

1939 births
Living people
American male sport wrestlers
Olympic wrestlers of the United States
Wrestlers at the 1960 Summer Olympics
People from Lycoming County, Pennsylvania